The 2022 Buffalo Bulls football team represented the University at Buffalo in the 2022 NCAA Division I FBS football season. The Bulls were led by second-year coach Maurice Linguist and played their home games at the University at Buffalo Stadium as members of the East Division of the Mid-American Conference.

Schedule

Source

Game summaries

at Maryland

No. 15 (FCS) Holy Cross

at Coastal Carolina

at Eastern Michigan

Miami (OH)

at Bowling Green

at UMass

Toledo

at Ohio

at Central Michigan

Kent State

Akron

vs. Georgia Southern (Camellia Bowl)

References

Buffalo
Buffalo Bulls football seasons
Camellia Bowl champion seasons
Buffalo Bulls football